Linaküla is one of the four villages on the island of Kihnu, in southwestern Estonia. Administratively it belongs to Kihnu Parish, Pärnu County. The village occupies the western coast of the island. In 2000, Linaküla had a population of 122.

Local government building, cultural centre, primary school and Kihnu Museum are located in Linaküla. There's also a beach camping for tourists.

References

Villages in Pärnu County